The 1955 football season was São Paulo's 26th season since club's existence.

Overall

{|class="wikitable"
|-
|Games played || 60 (9 Torneio Rio-São Paulo, 26 Campeonato Paulista, 25 Friendly match)
|-
|Games won || 28 (2 Torneio Rio-São Paulo, 16 Campeonato Paulista, 10 Friendly match)
|-
|Games drawn || 19 (2 Torneio Rio-São Paulo, 6 Campeonato Paulista, 11 Friendly match)
|-
|Games lost || 13 (5 Torneio Rio-São Paulo, 4 Campeonato Paulista, 4 Friendly match)
|-
|Goals scored || 129
|-
|Goals conceded || 79
|-
|Goal difference || +50
|-
|Best result || 6–1 (H) v Linense – Campeonato Paulista – 1955.12.17
|-
|Worst result || 1–4 (A) v La Salle – Friendly match – 1955.07.16
|-
|Most appearances || 
|-
|Top scorer || 
|-

Friendlies

Pequeña Taça del Mundo

Official competitions

Torneio Rio-São Paulo

Record

Campeonato Paulista

Record

External links
official website

References

Association football clubs 1955 season
1955
1955 in Brazilian football